John Jonah Jameson III (also known as Colonel Jupiter, the Man-Wolf and the Stargod) is a fictional character appearing in American comic books published by Marvel Comics. The character is depicted as the son of J. Jonah Jameson, and a friend to Peter Parker. He has also been portrayed as the husband of Jennifer Walters / She-Hulk.

Publication history
John Jameson debuted in The Amazing Spider-Man #1 (March 1963), and was created by Stan Lee and Steve Ditko. This first story introduces the character as a prominent astronaut.

During his lengthy stint on The Amazing Spider-Man during the 1970s, writer Gerry Conway had Jameson turned into a werewolf, with the new alias "the Man-Wolf". Conway explained:  As the Man-Wolf, Jameson was the lead feature in Creatures on the Loose #30-37 (July 1974-September 1975).

Fictional character biography
Born in New York City, John Jonah Jameson III is the son of The Daily Bugles irascible, gruff publisher John Jonah Jameson Junior. Jonah is immensely proud of his son, whom he sees as a true hero. Initially an astronaut, he was first seen being saved by Spider-Man when his craft malfunctioned on re-entry, something that did nothing to endear the wall-crawler to his father resenting Spider-Man's form of heroism.

On a later mission, Jameson was infected with spores that gave him superstrength, but strained his body and mind. He was forced to wear a strength-restraining Jupiter suit and battled Spider-Man at his father's urging before recovering and calling himself "Colonel Jupiter". His father convinced him to go after Spider-Man, who had been seen apparently robbing a bank. The web-slinger outsmarted him, and Jonah soon learned that Spider-Man was saving the bank from a bomb. However, Jameson did not care about the misunderstanding and was really out for revenge. Spider-Man managed to neutralize the spores with electricity, returning Jameson to normal.Manning "1960s" in Gilbert (2012), p. 37: "Spider-Man tangled with a powered-up John Jameson, driven half-mad by contact with spores encountered on a space walk."

While he was on the Moon, Jameson found the mystical Godstone, an other-dimensional ruby. The jewel grafted itself to his throat (after he made it into a pendant and started wearing it around his neck) and extended tendrils through his body. Moonlight activated the gem, which transformed him into the lycanthropic Man-Wolf, and he fought Spider-Man in this bestial form. The ruby was removed by Spider-Man. Some time after that, the ruby was reattached to Jameson by Morbius the Living Vampire who used the Man-Wolf as a pawn so that Morbius could find a cure for his condition. The Man-Wolf was again defeated by Spider-Man.

Later, he was transported to the dimension known as the Other Realm, from which the ruby originated and which was the source of the radiation from the ruby that transformed Jameson into the Man-Wolf. It was revealed that the ruby was created by the dying Stargod to pass on his powers to someone else. While on Earth, Jameson could only partially transform, resulting in his bestial form, while in the Other Realm he could fully transform, resulting in retention of his human intelligence and speech while in lupine form. He took up the mantle of the Stargod, acted as champion of the Other Realm, and gained new powers such as telepathy and energy manipulation. He fought his foes with a sword, a dagger and a longbow and arrows in this incarnation. Afterward, he opted to return to Earth, resulting in him losing the ability to fully transform and the loss of all memory of his ever being the Stargod. He became the Man-Wolf again during this period and became the Stargod again at one point, teaming up with the She-Hulk and the Hellcat. He later returned to Earth, becoming the Man-Wolf again, and allowed himself to be subjected to a procedure that destroyed the Godstone, restoring him to normal for some time.

Jameson became the pilot of Captain America's personal Quinjet for a period, using the call-sign of "Skywolf". During this time, he was temporarily transformed into the Man-Wolf by Dredmond Druid, who wanted the power of the Stargod for himself. Jameson then left Captain America's employ due to his attraction to Diamondback (Captain America's then-girlfriend).

Jameson remains friends with Spider-Man and often tries to convince his father to "let up on [Spider-Man]". He spent some time as Ravencroft's Head of Security and briefly dated its director, Dr. Ashley Kafka. The Carnage symbiote briefly overwhelmed Jameson, using him to commit further murders before Carnage eventually bonded with Ben Reilly (Spider-Man at that time). Both Jameson and Ashley were fired by a director who was angry about the Chameleon's escape and subsequent wounding by Kraven the Hunter. Via hypnotherapy, Kafka helped discover that Jack O'Lantern had caused him to attack his hospitalized father. This therapy also briefly unleashed Jameson's Man-Wolf form before Ashley was able to help Jameson suppress his changes once more.

During the Civil War storyline, Jameson helped Captain America while the latter was in hiding. He was assisting She-Hulk in locating and signing up unregistered superheroes. Jameson had also been registered as the Man-Wolf under the Superhuman Registration Act. During this time, the villain Stegron the Dinosaur Man temporarily transformed him into the Man-Wolf again, as a side-effect of a mad scheme to devolve the entire population of New York City. He attacked Mary Jane Watson and May Parker in Avengers Tower, but was subdued by Tony Stark's Guardsmen before he could harm them. Reed Richards subsequently cured him of this form.

Jameson had been dating the She-Hulk (Jennifer Walters) and the two had been living together for some time, along with Augustus Pugliese (the She-Hulk's co-worker). Eventually, they eloped in Las Vegas. However, Jameson was forced into becoming the Man-Wolf once more after being injected by a mysterious substance. After a brief rampage, Jameson stopped fighting his situation and became the Stargod again. He now retains his intelligence while in the Man-Wolf's form, has the Stargod's powers and apparently can switch between his human and lupine forms at will. His current superhuman status can be defined in his own words as "I am a god" and is supported by a battle with a clone of the Mad Titan Thanos in which he held his own. However, Jameson did not want to be the Stargod anymore because he felt that having the powers of a god made him arrogant and savage. The She-Hulk and the Stargod separated after the She-Hulk discovered that her feelings for Jameson were influenced prior to their marriage by Starfox and after she had also learned that Jameson had hoped to convince Jennifer to give up the She-Hulk identity permanently. Dejected, the Stargod sought adventure in outer space, before finally returning to Earth. He resumed his human form and tried to reconcile with Jennifer, but when Jennifer rejected him again, Jameson realized that their relationship was truly over and he signed the legal papers annulling their marriage.

When it came to Jameson's next mission into space, Alistair Alphonso Smythe, the Scorpion and the new villain the Fly-Girl attacked the launch site with an army of cyborg minions (each one wanting revenge on his father, J. Jonah Jameson) where the three sabotaged the launch and held Jameson for ransom. Jameson was saved in the end.

Soon after, Jameson was attacked on the Apogee 1 Space Station by co-workers who were being mind-controlled by Doctor Octopus, wanting to take control of the station. With the help of Spider-Man and the Human Torch, he was able to save the day and the station safely crashed into the ocean, its employees all alive and well.

Jameson would eventually go to work in the military testing out anti-symbiote weapons technology for the U.S. Armed Forces. He would eventually be contacted by Special Agent Clair Dixon in the tasking of apprehending Cletus Kasady; a.k.a. the supervillain known as Carnage. needing his expertise with the governmental developed Sonic Defense System on top of his experience with the alien-hosting serial killer. Jameson had believed that, with the Godstone shattered by Spider-Man some years back, he had been normalized and would no longer transform into the Man-Wolf again. But due to the regenerative nature of both it and its powers, his body would continually regrow a new jewel, which continued his transformations into the Man-Wolf.

Jameson appeared as a member of the Agents of Wakanda in his Man-Wolf form. He was shown fighting vampires in outer space beyond lunar orbit.  While Jameson was investigating Doverton, he was taken over by Carnage and his cult.  Jameson was forced to lay a trap for Venom and Spider-Man at Ravencroft, killing several Ravencroft guards in the process. Jameson eventually threw off Carnage's control and the symbiote was purged from his body.

Traumatized by his actions while mind-controlled, Jameson found it harder to change into the Man-Wolf. He became a security consultant at Ravencroft. During a prison riot that threatened to destroy the facility, Jameson overcame his traumas and regained his Man-Wolf form. When Norman Osborn became Director of Ravencroft, he dismissed Jameson and other staff members who might interfere with Osborn's plans for the facility.

Investigating an anomaly on the Moon, the Agents of Wakanda were attacked by Entea, an intelligent plant that had taken root there. Jameson became the Stargod again and the conflict with Entea ended once the Agents of Wakanda realized she was starving due to a lack of sustenance on the Moon. The Stargod opened a portal to the Other Realm for Entea to feed there, only to discover that, in his absence, some unknown disaster has reduced it to a desolate wasteland devoid of life.  Still, Entea was able to use the nutrients in the soil to take root and bring life back to the Other Realm. The other Agents returned to Earth and the Stargod remained in the Other Realm to help Entea settle in and to investigate the disaster, intending to return to Earth once that was completed.

Powers and abilities
John Jameson is a skilled pilot and astronaut and is experienced in hand-to-hand combat and the use of a variety of weapons. During his space flight to the gas giant planet Jupiter, alien spores found on the planet had attracted to and clung onto John on his return trip home. These spores changed his anatomical physiology, causing him to enlarge and become physically denser than normal; he also ran the risk of cardiovascular and neurological complications without use of a specially designed weighted suit which monitored his bio-readings. Also, using his powers increased psychological instability, causing him to become increasingly more violent and aggressive whenever his emotions ran away with him.

While Jameson was doing search and rescue missions in the Middle East, the American military discovered that another Godstone had grown within his body, the original having altered his physiology to the point that he now spawns replacement gems. When the new Godstone is ripped out and crushed by Carnage, another immediately grows back and heals Jameson.

As Colonel Jupiter
Due to alien spore infection, which was garnered during his space mission to Jupiter, Jameson had developed a supernormal physiology accommodating to the higher gravity and harsher atmospheric conditions of the planet. Doubling his original size and physical strength, particularly in his lower body which allows for jumping and leaping great distances at a time, even being able to move fast enough to intercept Spider-Man with relative ease. Colonel Jupiter also boasts increased skin, bone and muscle density; enough to resist superstrength blows from Spider-Man, as well as dish out enough force to rupture steel or shatter masonry barehanded, even by accident.

As the Man-Wolf
As the Man-Wolf, Jameson possessed superhuman strength, agility, speed and durability, an accelerated healing factor and heightened senses. He also has razor-sharp teeth and claws to use as weapons once transformed. The Man-Wolf's levels of strength and intelligence varied according to the phases of the moon. Jameson did not retain his human personality or intelligence while in his Man-Wolf form; though the bestial side is capable of speech, it does not talk too often. He was not a traditional supernatural werewolf and was thus invulnerable not only to silver, but to weapons in general.

As the Stargod 
While in the Other Realm, the Stargod possessed both his human intelligence and speech while in the Man-Wolf's body. As well as giving him vast superhuman strength, a high degree of durability on top of cosmic and telepathic powers. Jameson, eventually learning to utilize the Stargod power by force of will, could consciously change between his human and werewolf forms enabling him to fly across interstellar distances, survive within the cold depths of space unprotected and without a space suit, even teleport between dimensions like Earth and the Other Realm under his own power. He wears scale mail armor and uses a broadsword, a dagger, and a longbow with arrows as weapons.

Other versions

Earth X
On Earth X, Jameson lives on the Moon and is the father of Jay Jameson. He first appeared in Earth X #0.

House of M
In the House of M universe, Jameson was part of the project that gave the Fantastic Four their powers. Jameson is in the spacecraft along with Ben Grimm, Reed Richards, and Susan Storm. Instead of transforming into the Human Torch, he died along with Richards and Sue, leaving only Ben alive in the form of the Thing, but calling himself the It.

MC2
In the alternative universe of MC2, Jameson married Dr. Ashley Kafka and they had a son, Jack. Jack became the costumed adventurer known as the Buzz.

newuniversal
In the alternate world of newuniversal, Lieutenant General John Jameson is assistant to the Chairman of the Joint Chiefs of Staff, General Thad Ross, and is involved in arranging an airstrike to kill Ken Connell. The attempt is unsuccessful.

Spider-Gwen
On Earth-65, the home of Spider-Gwen, Jameson as the Man-Wolf is one of the major crime bosses of New York with henchmen working for him all over the city. When he starts targeting Spider-Woman (Gwen Stacy) and her friends, she defeats him and gets him arrested. Shortly after his arrest, his father, Mayor J. Jonah Jameson, has him released, claiming he "wasn't in the right mind" during his time as the Man-Wolf.

What If?
In "What If the Radioactive Spider Had Bitten Someone Else?", John Jameson is one of three candidates - along with Betty Brant and Flash Thompson - who is bitten by the radioactive spider which gave Spider-Man his powers. Equipped with a rocket pack, and upon his father's relentless prompting for the sake of his paper's publicity, John begins to fight crime as "Spider-Jameson". However, when he attempts to save an astronaut from his crashing capsule (the same situation from which he was saved by Spider-Man in mainstream continuity), his rocket pack runs out of fuel, but Jameson heroically sacrifices his life by using his own body to cushion the capsule's impact. The death of his son makes Jonah Jameson re-think his relentless attitudes, and he subsequently dedicates The Daily Bugle to the promotion of superheroes, not their persecution.

In other media
Television
 John Jameson appears in the 1990s Spider-Man series, voiced by Michael Horton. In the three-part episode "The Alien Costume", he unwittingly brings the Venom symbiote to Earth and is attacked by the Rhino, who causes his shuttle to crash-land while securing a mineral sample. After being hospitalized, the Shocker abducts John to bring Spider-Man and John's father J. Jonah Jameson to an abandoned church. While Spider-Man fights Shocker, Jameson gets his son out.
 John Jameson / Man-Wolf appears in Spider-Man Unlimited, with John Payne voicing the former and Scott McNeil providing the latter's vocal effects. While traveling into space, he crashes on Counter-Earth despite Spider-Man's efforts to stop Venom and Carnage. Following this, both John and the web-slinger join the human Resistance against the High Evolutionary and his Beastials. After being subjected to the High Evolutionary's experiments in the episode "Ill-Met By Moonlight", John gains the ability to transform into the Man-Wolf whenever he gets angry.
 John Jameson / Colonel Jupiter appears in The Spectacular Spider-Man, voiced by Daran Norris. In the season one episode "The Uncertainty Principle", John goes into space and nearly crash-lands after his shuttle is hit by a meteor storm. He is able to land safely, but unknowingly brings the Venom symbiote to Earth and is exposed to alien spores. By the season two episode, "Growing Pains", John became bigger, heavier, and stronger. As a result, Curt Connors develops a special containment suit for him while John's father, J. Jonah Jameson, convinces him to become the superhero Colonel Jupiter. Following an attack by Venom, who frames Spider-Man for it, the spores' effects increase, leading to John attacking the web-slinger. After a brutal fight, Spider-Man discovers his opponent's weakness to electricity and restores him to normal. However, John is sent to Ravencroft, having become addicted to the spores' power.
 John Jameson / Man-Wolf appears in Ultimate Spider-Man, voiced by Nolan North. This version of John's Man-Wolf form sports trappings and the sword of his Stargod form. In the episode "The Man-Wolf", while working on Daily Bugle Communications' lunar space station, John sends a distress signal, which Spider-Man and his fellow S.H.I.E.L.D. trainees answer. The heroes later discover John's construction crew found the ruins of an advanced civilization harboring a number of strange jewels, one of which embedded itself in John's chest and triggered his feral Man-Wolf transformation. Spider-Man manages to shatter the jewel, but the sudden reversion causes John to retain some of his lupine features. As such, he is kept in S.H.I.E.L.D. custody for treatment. Following this, John makes minor reappearances throughout the series.
 John Jameson / Man-Wolf appears in the 2017 Spider-Man series, voiced by Josh Keaton. Following a minor appearance in the episode "Osborn Academy", John appears in "Halloween Moon", where he and Harry Osborn work on an experiment involving a lunar crystal that feeds off gamma radiation. However, it turns John into the Man-Wolf, whose scratch can turn others into werewolves as well. As a result, Harry joins forces with Spider-Man, the Hulk, and Gwen Stacy to reverse the transformation and cure the infected.

Film
 John Jameson appears in Spider-Man 2, portrayed by Daniel Gillies. An astronaut noted for apparently being the first man to play football on the Moon, this version quickly develops a relationship with Mary Jane Watson, who immediately accepts his marriage proposal. However, she eventually realizes that she does not truly love him and leaves him at the altar to be with Peter Parker.
 John Jameson, credited as J.J. Jameson III''', makes a cameo appearance in Venom, portrayed by Chris O'Hara. An employee of the Life Foundation, this version is the sole surviving astronaut of Carlton Drake's spaceship after it crash-lands in Malaysia, though his body is infected by the Riot symbiote. As John is moved by Malaysian EMTs, Riot crashes the ambulance, leaving John's fate unknown.

Video games
 John Jameson appears in the Spider-Man 2 film tie-in game, voiced by Charles Klausmeyer.
 Spider-Jameson from the What If? comics appears as a playable character in Spider-Man Unlimited.

Reception
The Man-Wolf was ranked #21 on Den of Geek's listing of Marvel Comics' monster characters in 2015.

In 2022, Screen Rant'' included Man-Wolf in their "10 Spider-Man Villains That Are Smarter Than They Seem" list.

References

External links
John Jameson at Marvel.com
Man-Wolf at Marvel Database
John Jameson at Marvel Directory

John Jameson at Comic Vine
Man-Wolf at Don Markstein's Toonopedia. Archived from the original on February 13, 2016.

Characters created by Gerry Conway
Characters created by Roy Thomas
Characters created by Stan Lee
Characters created by Steve Ditko
Comics characters introduced in 1963
Fictional characters from New York City
Fictional characters with dissociative identity disorder
Fictional characters with superhuman durability or invulnerability
Fictional characters with superhuman senses
Fictional NASA astronauts
Fictional therianthropes
Fictional werewolves
Marvel Comics characters who can move at superhuman speeds
Marvel Comics characters with accelerated healing
Marvel Comics characters with superhuman strength
Marvel Comics deities
Marvel Comics film characters
Marvel Comics mutates
Marvel Comics superheroes
Spider-Man characters